The 2017–18 season was FCSB's 70th season since its founding in 1947.

Previous season positions

Players

First team squad

Transfers

In

Out

Overall transfer activity

Expenditure
Summer:   €8,110,000

Winter:   €50,000

Total:    €8,160,000

Income
Summer:   €2,240,000

Winter:   €2,000,000

Total:    €4,240,000

Net Totals
Summer:   €5,870,000

Winter:   €1,950,000

Total:    €3,920,000

Friendly matches

Competitions

Overview

Liga I

Regular season

Table

Position by round

Results

Championship round

Table

Position by round

Results

Cupa României

Results

UEFA Champions League

Qualifying rounds

Third qualifying round

Play-off round

UEFA Europa League

Group stage

Results

Knockout phase

Round of 32

Statistics

Appearances and goals

! colspan="13" style="background:#DCDCDC; text-align:center" | Players from Steaua II
|-

! colspan="13" style="background:#DCDCDC; text-align:center" | Players transferred out during the season
|-

|}

Squad statistics
{|class="wikitable" style="text-align: center;"
|-
! 
! style="width:70px;"|Liga I
! style="width:70px;"|Cupa României
! style="width:70px;"|Champions League
! style="width:70px;"|Europa League
! style="width:70px;"|Home
! style="width:70px;"|Away
! style="width:70px;"|Total Stats
|-
|align=left|Games played       || 36 || 3 || 4 || 8 || 24 || 27 || 51
|-
|align=left|Games won          || 22 || 2 || 1 || 4 || 16 || 13 || 29
|-
|align=left|Games drawn        || 10 || 0 || 2 || 1 || 7 || 6 || 13
|-
|align=left|Games lost         || 4 || 1 || 1 || 3 || 2 || 7 || 9
|-
|align=left|Goals scored       || 66 || 9 || 7 || 11 || 46 || 47 || 93
|-
|align=left|Goals conceded     || 24 || 4 || 8 || 12 || 18 || 30 || 48
|-
|align=left|Goal difference    || +42 || +5 || -1 || -1 || +28 || +17 || +45
|-
|align=left|Clean sheets       || 16 || 1 || 1 || 2 || 12 || 8 || 20
|-
|align=left|Goal by Substitute || 12 || 1 || 0 || 3 || 6 || 10 || 16
|-
|align=left|Total shots        || – || – || – || – || – || – || –
|-
|align=left|Shots on target    || – || – || – || – || – || – || –
|-
|align=left|Corners            || – || – || – || – || – || – || –
|-
|align=left|Players used       || – || – || – || – || – || – || –
|-
|align=left|Offsides           || – || – || – || – || – || – || –
|-
|align=left|Fouls suffered     || – || – || – || – || – || – || –
|-
|align=left|Fouls committed    || – || – || – || – || – || – || –
|-
|align=left|Yellow cards       || 95 || 6 || 11 || 18 || 55 || 75 || 130
|-
|align=left|Red cards          || 3 || 1 || 1 || 0 || 1 || 4 || 5
|-
|align=left| Winning rate      || % || % || % || % || % || % || %
|-

Goalscorers

Goal minutes

Last updated: 20 May 2018 (UTC) 
Source: FCSB

Hat-tricks

(H) – Home ; (A) – Away

Clean sheets

1 Florin Niță was transferred to Sparta Prague during the winter transfer window.

Disciplinary record

Attendances

Awards

Digi Sport Liga I Player of the Month

Romanian Footballer of the Year

Liga I Foreign Player of the Year

Best Team of the Championship Play-offs
Source:

See also

 2017–18 Cupa României
 2017–18 Liga I
 2017–18 UEFA Champions League
 2017–18 UEFA Europa League

Notes and references

FC Steaua București seasons
Steaua București
Steaua București
Steaua